The 1936 United States presidential election in Arkansas took place on November 3, 1936, as part of the 1936 United States presidential election. State voters chose nine representatives, or electors, to the Electoral College, who voted for president and vice president.

Background
Except for the Unionist Ozark counties of Newton and Searcy where Republicans controlled local government, Arkansas since the end of Reconstruction had been a classic one-party Democratic “Solid South” state. Disfranchisement of effectively all Negroes and most poor whites had meant that outside those two aberrant counties, the Republican Party was completely moribund and Democratic primaries the only competitive elections.

The 1920s did see a minor change in this, as increased voting by poor Ozark whites as a protest against Woodrow Wilson's internationalist foreign policy meant that Warren G. Harding was able to win almost forty percent of the statewide vote in 1920; however despite his national landslide Calvin Coolidge in 1924 could not do any more than win the two traditional Unionist GOP counties. 1928 saw the rest of the Outer South and North Alabama bolt the anti-Prohibition Catholic Al Smith, but the presence of Arkansas Senator Joseph Taylor Robinson as running mate meant that within Arkansas only the most northwesterly counties with ordinarily substantial Republican votes would suffer the same fate.

The following years saw Arkansas plunge into the Great Depression, followed almost immediately by a major drought from the summer of 1930s until the winter of 1931/1932. This came on top of a long depression in agriculture, which was still the dominant player in Arkansas’ economy and was backed up by the “Great Migration” of the state's agricultural labor force to northeastern and midwestern cities. Arkansas gave extremely heavy support to Democrat Franklin Roosevelt in 1932. Roosevelt won every county in the state, becoming the first Democrat to win Searcy County since before the Civil War and only the second to win adjacent Newton County.

Throughout his first term as President, Roosevelt was extremely popular in the “Solid South” and despite embryonic concerns over loss of southern control of the national party due to abolition of the “two-thirds” rule and some hostility to FDR's repeal of Prohibition he was overwhelmingly and in many places almost unanimously supported by Arkansas’ limited electorate. Ozark Republican Landon did regain the two Unionist and Prohibitionist Ozark counties, but topped 40% in only two of the remaining seventy-three.

Results

Results by county

See also
 United States presidential elections in Arkansas

References

Arkansas
1936